Athens is an unincorporated community in Monroe County, Mississippi.

Among the notable residents of Athens was attorney Samuel J. Gholson, a United States Congressman, judge, and Confederate general in the Civil War.

Athens served as county seat from 1830–36 and then again from 1842–1850, however there was no courthouse built in Athens for the second turn as county seat. This jail was constructed in 1830 by W. S. Cook

References

Unincorporated communities in Monroe County, Mississippi
Unincorporated communities in Mississippi